Michel Françaix (born 28 May 1943) was a member of the National Assembly of France.  He represented Oise's 3rd constituency from 1997 to 2017, as a member of the Socialiste, radical, citoyen et divers gauche.

References

1948 births
Living people
Socialist Party (France) politicians
Deputies of the 11th National Assembly of the French Fifth Republic
Deputies of the 12th National Assembly of the French Fifth Republic
Deputies of the 13th National Assembly of the French Fifth Republic
Deputies of the 14th National Assembly of the French Fifth Republic